The following is a list of Idaho State Bengals men's basketball head coaches at Idaho State University in Pocatello, Idaho. The Idaho State Bengals men's basketball program has been led by 16 head coaches in their Division I history. The sortable list is by total number of program wins.

Idaho State University has NCAA Tournament appearances in 1953, 1954, 1955, 1956, 1957, 1958, 1959, 1960, 1974, 1977 and 1987. The teams reached the sweet 16 in 1954, 1957, 1958, 1959, and 1977. The Bengals reached the Elite Eight in 1977.

References

Idaho State Bengals
 *
College sports in Idaho
Idaho State Bengals basketball coaches